Eva Pfaff and Elizabeth Smylie were the defending champions but they competed with different partners that year, Pfaff with Manon Bollegraf and Smylie with Wendy Turnbull.

Bollegraf and Pfaff lost in the first round to Beth Herr and Candy Reynolds.

Smylie and Turnbull lost in the quarterfinals to Jana Novotná and Helena Suková.

Katrina Adams and Zina Garrison won the final 6–3 after Novotná and Suková were forced to retire.

Seeds
Champion seeds are indicated in bold text while text in italics indicates the round in which those seeds were eliminated.

Draw

Final

Top half

Bottom half

External links
 1989 Pilkington Glass Championships Doubles draw

Doubles
Doubles 1989